Oppavia (minor planet designation: 255 Oppavia) is a sizeable Main belt asteroid. It was discovered by Austrian astronomer Johann Palisa on 31 March 1886 in Vienna and was named after Opava, a town in the Czech Republic, then part of Austria-Hungary, where Palisa was born. The orbital plane is inclined by an angle of 9.47° to the plane of the ecliptic.

The unusual light curve shows three uneven minima and maxima per cycle. In 1995, 255 Oppavia was suggested as a peripheral member of the now defunct Ceres asteroid family, but was found to be an unrelated interloper on the basis of its non-matching spectral type. It classified as a dark X-type asteroid in the Tholen taxonomy.

References

External links 
The Asteroid Orbital Elements Database
Minor Planet Discovery Circumstances
Asteroid Lightcurve Data File
Orbital simulation of asteroid 255 Oppavia
Asteroid 255 Oppavia in Planetky z našich luhů a hájů (in Czech)
 
 

Gefion asteroids
Oppavia
Oppavia
X-type asteroids (Tholen)
18860331